The Colyaer Martin3 S100 is a Spanish ultralight aircraft, designed and produced by Colyaer of Portonovo.

Design and development
The aircraft was designed to comply with the Fédération Aéronautique Internationale microlight rules. It features a cantilever high-wing, a two-seats-in-side-by-side configuration enclosed cockpit, fixed tricycle landing gear and a single engine in pusher configuration.

The aircraft is made from composites. The long wingspan gives the Martin3 a glide ratio of 23:1 and allows power-off soaring flights. The standard engine is the  Rotax 912ULS four-stroke powerplant.

In 2015 the aircraft was marketed by Galicia Avionica SL.

Specifications (Martin3 S100)

References

External links

1990s Spanish ultralight aircraft
Homebuilt aircraft
Single-engined pusher aircraft